Bill Dillon may refer to:

Bill Dillon (footballer) (1905–1979), Gaelic football player
Bill Dillon (politician) (born 1933), New Zealand politician

See also
William Dillon (disambiguation)